Son Seung-lak (Hangul: 손승락, Hanja: 孫勝洛) (born March 4, 1982 in Daegu) is a retired South Korean closer who played for the Hyundai Unicorns, the Nexen Heroes, and the Lotte Giants in the Korea Professional Baseball. He bats and throws right-handed.

Amateur career
While attending Daegu High School, Son's main position was shortstop in the team.

However, Son decided to enter the Unicorns after graduation from college and continued to play baseball as a pitcher at Yeungnam University in Daegu. At Yeungnam University, he developed into one of the top collegiate pitchers along with Oh Seung-Hwan and Jang Won-Sam. In , Son was selected for the South Korean national team as an amateur player and participated in the Baseball World Cup held in Havana, Cuba. At the World Cup, he led team in innings pitched with 18.1 and earned a save against Italy in the round-robin stage.

Notable international careers

Professional career
He spent his rookie year as a full-time starting pitcher but went a disappointing 5-10 with a 5.43 ERA.

In , Son started the season in the bullpen and occasionally appeared in games as a No.5 starter in the middle of the season. As a utility pitcher, he finished the season with a 6-5 record, 2 holds and an ERA of 4.17.

However, Son was sidelined with injuries for the whole  season and after the season he left the team to perform two-year military duty. During the duty, Son played for the Police Baseball Team in the Korea Baseball Futures League on the side. In September , he was selected for the South Korea national baseball team again and competed in the Baseball World Cup as a starting pitcher.

In , Son came back to the pro baseball league after finishing the two-year military service. He led the KBO league in saves and became the first Hero to win a title in any individual categories.

Son had another strong season as a KBO top closer in  when he had a career-low ERA of 1.89, saved 17 games, and won 4.

Son continued to dominate in 2012 and 2013, when he recorded 33 and 46 saves, respectively. Despite sub-par seasons in 2014 and 2015, Son attained Free Agent status after the 2015 season, and signed a four-year, KRW 6 billion contract with the Lotte Giants. While he failed to live up to the expectations in 2016, with a 4.26 ERA and only 20 saves, he rebounded in 2017 to re-establish himself as the league's best closer. He led the Giants to the team's first playoff appearance in 5 years, finishing the season with 37 saves and a 2.18 ERA.

Son decided to retire after the 2019 season due to a conflict with Giants about salary negotiations. Son finished his career second on all the all-time saves list in the KBO with 271.

Notable international careers

See also 
 List of KBO career saves leaders

External links 

 
 Profile and stats from KBO (official website)

Kiwoom Heroes players
Hyundai Unicorns players
Lotte Giants players
South Korean baseball players
1982 births
Living people
2013 World Baseball Classic players
Yeungnam University alumni
Sportspeople from Daegu
South Korean Buddhists